Wayne Bennett is the name of:
Wayne Bennett (blues guitarist) (1931–1992), American blues guitarist
Wayne Bennett (politician), Canadian politician
Wayne Bennett (rugby league) (born 1950), Australian rugby league football coach and former player
Wayne D. Bennett (1927–2015), American politician
Wayne "Lotek" Bennett (born 1977), English songwriter